Minuscule 792 (in the Gregory-Aland numbering), ε585 (von Soden), is a Greek minuscule manuscript of the New Testament written on paper. Palaeographically it has been assigned to the 13th century. The manuscript has complex contents.

Description 
The codex contains the text of the four Gospels and Book of Revelation, on 145 parchment leaves (size ). It contains also some passages of the Old Testament.

The text is written in one column per page, 32-40 lines per page.

There is also another division according to the smaller Ammonian Sections.

Text 
The Greek text of the codex is a representative of the Byzantine text-type. Hermann von Soden classified it to the textual family Kak, but with some hesitation. Aland did not place it in any Category.

According to the Claremont Profile Method it has mixed Byzantine text in Luke 1, Luke 10, and Luke 20. It creates textual pair with minuscule 2643.

It lacks the text of Matthew 16:2b–3.

History 
According to Gregory the manuscript was written in the 13th century. The manuscript is currently dated by the INTF to the 13th century. The manuscript was written in Calabria. The manuscript was once presented by Demetrius to Bernardus.

The manuscript was noticed in catalogue from 1876.

It was added to the list of New Testament manuscripts by Gregory (792). Gregory saw the manuscript in 1886. Text of Apocalypse was collated by Herman C. Hoskier.

The manuscript is now housed at the National Library of Greece (107) in Athens.

See also 

 List of New Testament minuscules
 Biblical manuscript
 Textual criticism
 Minuscule 791

References

Further reading 

 

Greek New Testament minuscules
13th-century biblical manuscripts
Manuscripts of the National Library of Greece